Matt Hatter Chronicles, is an animated series produced by UK's Platinum Films, Arc Productions, and Dream Mill. It began airing on Teletoon on 8 September 2012.

It aired on Cartoon Network in India on 19 May 2014. Season 3 premiered on 13 April 2015 on Cartoon Network (India).

Production 
Voice acting for the series was primarily recorded at Pinewood Studios in the UK.
Platinum Films, which produces and distributes the series, appointed CGI animation studio Xentrix Studios in Bengaluru, India to animate Season 3 in 2014.

Synopsis 
Matt Hatter is an ordinary child who discovers that the monsters of his family's horror movies are alive in another dimension called "the Multiverse", controlled by the nefarious Lord Tenoroc. This dimension can only be accessed through the Notting Hill Coronet, his family's movie theater. With his grandfather Alfred trapped inside the Multiverse, Matt, along with his new friends Roxie and Gomez, must capture the movie monsters, save Alfred, and restore peace to the Multiverse.

Characters

Main 
 Matthew Luke "Matt" Hatter (voiced by Tommy Campbell): A 13-year-old boy and a Hatter Hero in Training, who is determined to book all of the Coronet supervillains that will help free his grandfather, Alfred Hatter, from his prison cell.
 Roxanna "Roxie" Alexis (voiced by Larissa Murray): A 13-year old pink skinned and magenta haired girl from the Multiverse who is a Tracker of Team Hatter. She wields a staff that was created from the ancient Tree of Life by Gomez, and holds an amber crystal on the end that calls Matt when the Multiverse is in danger.
 Alejandro Diego Gomez Montero (voiced by Marcel McCalla): A 12-year-old boy from the Multiverse who is the Keeper of Team Hatter. He wields a weapon from the Cave of Secrets that used to belong to his father.
 Marlon: A dwarf Tasmanian devil who is Matt's best friend and pet, and loves to eat junk food and sleep. He speaks in a language that Matt and even Roxie understands called "Chittersqueak".

Antagonists 
 Lord Tenoroc (voiced by Kevin Eldon)

Other 
 Alfred Hatter: Matt's grandfather.

Episodes

Season 1

Season 2

Season 3

Season 4

TV movie

References

External links

 

2011 British television series debuts
2012 British television series endings
2011 Canadian television series debuts
2012 Canadian television series endings
2010s British animated television series
2010s British children's television series
2010s Canadian animated television series
2010s Canadian children's television series
British children's animated action television series
British children's animated adventure television series
British children's animated comic science fiction television series
British children's animated drama television series
British children's animated horror television series
British children's animated science fantasy television series
British computer-animated television series
Canadian children's animated action television series
Canadian children's animated adventure television series
Canadian children's animated comic science fiction television series
Canadian children's animated drama television series
Canadian children's animated horror television series
Canadian children's animated science fantasy television series
Canadian computer-animated television series
English-language television shows
Indian children's animated action television series
Indian children's animated adventure television series
Indian children's animated science fantasy television series
ITV children's television shows
Teen animated television series
Teletoon original programming
Television series by Endemol
Television series by ITV Studios